Anthony Caruso may refer to:

Anthony Caruso (actor), American
Anthony Caruso (entrepreneur), president and CEO of CSA Group